Stale may refer to:

Ståle, a Norwegian surname
Stale, Poland, a village in Gmina Grębów, Tarnobrzeg County, Subcarpathian Voivodeship, in south-eastern Poland
Stale pointer bug, or aliasing bug, a class of programming error in dynamic memory allocation where a pointer designates deallocated memory

See also
Stalemate, a situation in the game of chess where the player whose turn it is to move is not in check but has no legal move
Stalewo
Staley (disambiguation)
Stalled
Staller